The 1928 Haskell Indians football team was an American football that represented the Haskell Institute (now known as Haskell Indian Nations University) during the 1928 college football season. In its second and final year under head coach John Webster Thomas, the team compiled a 5–5 record.

Schedule

References

Haskell
Haskell Indian Nations Fighting Indians football seasons
Haskell Indians football